Butts Lane Halt was a railway station in the Blowick suburb of Southport, Merseyside.

History
The station opened on 18 December 1909 as a halt on the Liverpool, Southport and Preston Junction Railway, and consisted of simple cinder based platforms at track level, situated on an embankment to the south of Butts Lane bridge.

The station closed on 26 September 1938, though the line remains open and is today used by trains on the Northern Manchester to Southport Line.

References

Sources

 Gell, Rob (1986). An Illustrated Survey of Railway Stations Between Southport & Liverpool 1848-1986. Heyday Publishing Company, .

External links 
 Butts Lane Halt via Disused Stations
 The line and mileages via Railwaycodes

Disused railway stations in the Metropolitan Borough of Sefton
Former Lancashire and Yorkshire Railway stations
Railway stations in Great Britain opened in 1909
Railway stations in Great Britain closed in 1938
Buildings and structures in Southport